In the theatre of ancient Greece, the  was one of three stock characters in comedy, corresponding to the English buffoon. The  is marked by his wit, his crudity of language, and his frequent non-illusory audience address. 

In modern Greek, the word refers to a foul-mouthed person.

See also
 Alazôn
 Eirôn

References

Sources
 Carlson, Marvin. 1993. Theories of the Theatre: A Historical and Critical Survey from the Greeks to the Present. Expanded ed. Ithaca and London: Cornell University Press. 
 Frye, Northrop. 1957. Anatomy of Criticism: Four Essays. London: Penguin, 1990. 
 Janko, Richard, trans. 1987. Poetics with Tractatus Coislinianus, Reconstruction of Poetics II and the Fragments of the On Poets. By Aristotle. Cambridge: Hackett. 

Ancient Greek theatre
Fictional jesters
Stock characters in ancient Greek comedy
Male characters in theatre